Alireza Rahai (Persian: علیرضا رهایی, born  1954 in Kazeroon, Iran) is an Iranian engineer, academic, scholar and professor at the Department of Civil and Environmental Engineering of Amirkabir University of Technology.
He is also a member of the Iranian Science and Culture Hall of Fame, Vice President for Academic and Post Graduate Affairs of Islamic Azad University and the former Chancellor of the Amirkabir University of Technology.

References

1954 births
Iranian engineers
Living people
People from Kazerun
Iranian Science and Culture Hall of Fame recipients in Engineering